Deoli is a small town and a municipal council in Wardha district  in the state of Maharashtra, India.

Geography
It has an average elevation of 262 metres (859 feet).

Demographics
 India census, Deoli had a population of 19,288. Males constitute 51% of the population and females 49%. And 2011 Census Population 19288 Deoli has an average literacy rate of 72%, higher than the national average of 59.5%: male literacy is 78% and, female literacy is 65%. In Deoli, 12% of the population is under 6 years of age.

References

Cities and towns in Wardha district
Talukas in Maharashtra